Neargyria persimilis is a moth in the family Crambidae. It was described by George Hampson in 1919. It is found in Papua New Guinea, where it has been recorded from the D'Entrecasteaux Islands of Goodenough Island and Woodlark Island.

References

Crambinae
Endemic fauna of Papua New Guinea
Moths of Papua New Guinea
D'Entrecasteaux Islands
Woodlark Islands
Moths described in 1919